Pyotr Sokolov may refer to

  (1764–1835), secretary of the Russian Academy
 Pyotr Sokolov (portraitist) (1791–1848), Russian portraitist, father of the painter of the same name
 Pyotr Sokolov (painter) (1821–1899), Russian painter and graphic artist, son of the portraitist of the same name
 Pyotr Sokolov (footballer) (1890–1971), Russian football player and spy